"Do It or Die" is a song by Atlanta Rhythm Section. It was released as a single in 1979 from their album Underdog.

The song was a top 20 hit on both the Hot 100 and Adult Contemporary charts, peaking at No. 19 and No. 11 respectively.

Chart performance

References

1979 songs
1979 singles
Atlanta Rhythm Section songs
Polydor Records singles
Songs written by Buddy Buie
Songs written by J. R. Cobb